Findlay City School District is a school district serving students in Findlay, Ohio and surrounding communities.

Schools

Elementary schools

 Bigelow Elementary School
 Chamberlin Hill Elementary School
 Jacobs Elementary School
 Jefferson Elementary School
 Northview Elementary School
 Washington Elementary School
 Whittier Elementary School
 Wilson Vance Elementary School

Middle schools

 Donnell Middle School      
 Glenwood Middle School

High schools
 Findlay High School

Fee Schedule

Findlay City School District charges annual fees to students, the fee schedule is as below:

Preschool: $20.00
Kindergarten: $43.00
First Grade: $43.00
Second Grade: $43.00
Third Grade: $43.00
Fourth Grade: $43.00
Fifth Grade: $43.00
Sixth Grade: $60.00
Seventh Grade: $60.00
Eighth Grade: $60.00

External links
 Findlay City School District official website

References

Findlay, Ohio
Education in Hancock County, Ohio
School districts in Ohio